Sansiz (also Romanized as Sānsīz; also known as Kishlak, Qeshlāq-e Bālā, Qishlāq, Sānsan, Sānsez, Sānsūr, and Sānsūz) is a village in Dast Jerdeh Rural District, Chavarzaq District, Tarom County, Zanjan Province, Iran. At the 2006 census, its population was 893, in 214 families.

References 

Populated places in Tarom County